Olimp is a summer resort on the Romanian seacoast, on the Black Sea,  north of Mangalia.The Comorova forest is near the summer resort.
It has a tall waterfront between beach and many hotels.

External links 

Mangalia
Olimp